The 2021–22 Oman Professional League aka "Omantel League" is the 46th edition of the Oman Professional League, the top football league in Oman. The season started on 16 October 2021.

Team 
The same teams from the cancelled season will continue. The clubs are:

League table

References 

Top level Omani football league seasons
2021–22 in Omani football
Oman
Oman Professional League, 2021–22